Only is a studio album by Australian guitarist Tommy Emmanuel, released in August 2000. The album peaked at number 53 on the ARIA Charts.

Reception

Jonathan Widran from AllMusic said "His acoustic style is so rustic that listeners even 'hear the wood', so to speak, almost as harmony accents to his melodies. The untrained ear might think there's too much sameness from track to track, but closer listens reveal some interesting mood swings from the dark and hauntingly romantic "Those Who Wait" and "Questions" to more upbeat, folky ramblers like "Timberlake Road" and the truly locomotive "Train to Dusseldorf"."

Minor 7th said "Only a few times in a lifetime does an artist come along who can do such magical things with six wires stretched over a wooden box that you'd swear he or she has a direct conduit to some karmic pool of creativity where access is given to only a special few... Emmanuel is such an artist."

Track listing

Charts

References

2000 albums
Tommy Emmanuel albums